Guilty as Hell is a 1932 American pre-Code mystery film directed by Erle C. Kenton and written by Arthur Kober and Frank Partos. The film stars Edmund Lowe, Victor McLaglen, Richard Arlen, Adrienne Ames, Henry Stephenson, Ralph Ince and Noel Francis. The film was released on August 5, 1932, by Paramount Pictures.

Cast 
Edmund Lowe as Russell Kirk
Victor McLaglen as Detective Capt. T.R. McKinley
Richard Arlen as Frank C. Marsh
Adrienne Ames as Vera Marsh
Henry Stephenson as Dr. Ernest S. Tindal
Ralph Ince as Jack Reed
Noel Francis as Julia Reed
Elizabeth Patterson as Elvira Ward
Arnold Lucy as Dr. Sully
Willard Robertson as Police Sgt. Alcock
Richard Tucker as District Attorney
Fred Kelsey as Detective Duffy
Claire Dodd as Ruth Tindal
Lillian Harmer as Mrs. Alvin

References

External links 
 

1932 films
American mystery films
1932 mystery films
Paramount Pictures films
Films directed by Erle C. Kenton
American black-and-white films
1930s English-language films
1930s American films